Chicken sickles are a number of Chinese bladed weapons similar to the Hook sword and the Okinawan Kama. They can be used as a single or double weapon. It is considered the special weapon of the Xinyi Liuhe style.

Chicken-claw

 Jī Zhuǎ Lián. The chicken-claw sickle was constructed from a chicken claw-like piece of metal, along with a spear head, on a length of stick. Its length was about 1.5 ft. The details of this weapon are unknown.

This sickle is more similar in appearance to the Okinawan Kama, with the addition of a spear head.

Chicken-saber
Jī Dāo Lián. This weapon was also called the Kǔn Huā Yāo Zi. The reason for this optional name is unknown. According to legend, this weapon was created by the founder of Xinyi, Ji Long Feng (姬隆丰), and it became the special weapon of this style. It was made from metal and its length was about 2.5 Chi [32 inches].”

This sickle is similar in appearance to the Hook sword and although it is named a Dao (saber), it is based on the double-edged sword (Jian). There are several variations of this weapon. All have the distinctive hook and chicken "spur" on the head, but the sword blade is sometimes shortened to a small metal pole-arm. It is used for close-quarters combat.

One noted practitioner of the Chicken-Saber Sickles was Xinyi Liuhe Grandmaster Lu Songgao (卢嵩高) (d. 1962), one of the "Three Heroes from Zhoukou". Xinyi Liuhe and Wu-style t'ai chi master Dr. Stephen Yan (Yan Zhi Yuan), weapons champion of the First National Xinyi Liuhe Competition held in Henan Province in 2000, is pictured below wielding the Chicken-Sabers.

See also
 Hook sword
 Kama (weapon)
 List of martial arts weapons
 Shaolin kung fu
 Ming Dynasty

Notes and references

Blade weapons
Chinese melee weapons
Weapons of China